David Stewart was an amateur Scottish football wing half who played in the Scottish League for Hamilton Academical and Queen's Park. He was capped by Scotland at amateur level.

References 

Scottish footballers
Scottish Football League players
Queen's Park F.C. players
Association football wing halves
Scotland amateur international footballers
Year of birth missing
Place of birth missing
Hamilton Academical F.C. players
Larkhall Thistle F.C. players